Heimliche Ehen is a 1956 East German comedy film directed by Gustav von Wangenheim.
It stars Paul Heidemann and Gerd Michael Henneberg.

Cast
 Paul Heidemann as Trucks
 Gerd Michael Henneberg as Fischer
 Siegfried Hömke as Junger Bauer
 Helga Jordan as Hanni
 Hans Klering as Knetsch
 Waltraud Kogel as Sekretärin Sellger
 Gisela Kugland as Sekretärin
 Franz Kutschera as Raugraff
 Otto Lange as Bauer
 Marga Legal as Frau Oberlin
 Werner Lierck as Fahrer Max
 Erich Loesche 	as Maurer
 Armin Mueller-Stahl as Norbert
 Wilhelm Nickel as Alter Wächter
 Reinhold Pasch as Mitarbeiter Lehmann

References

External links
 

1956 films
1956 comedy films
German comedy films
East German films
1950s German-language films
1950s German films
German black-and-white films